The men's sanda (as Sanshou) 65 kg competition at the 2010 Asian Games in Guangzhou, China was held from 14 November to 17 November at the Nansha Gymnasium.

A total of thirteen competitors from thirteen different countries competed in this event, limited to fighters whose body weight was less than 65 kilograms.

Zhang Junyong from China won the gold medal after beating Nguyễn Văn Tuấn of Vietnam in gold medal bout 2–0, Zhang won both periods in the final. The bronze medal was shared by Mark Eddiva from the Philippines and Hyun Chang-ho of South Korea. Athletes from Iran (Javad Aghaei), Pakistan (Maaz Khan), Macau (Cai Jun Long) and Turkmenistan (Kurbangeldi Atageldiýew) shared the fifth place.

Five more athletes from Sri Lanka, Thailand, Kyrgyzstan, Nepal and Kazakhstan lost in the first round without winning a single round and did not advance further.

Schedule
All times are China Standard Time (UTC+08:00)

Results
Legend
AV — Absolute victory

References

External links
Official website

Men's sanda 65 kg